is a Prefectural Natural Park in the hills of northwest Nara Prefecture, Japan. Established in 1967, the park spans the borders of the municipalities of Nara, Yamatokōriyama, Ikoma, and Ikaruga.

See also
 National Parks of Japan
 Kongō-Ikoma-Kisen Quasi-National Park

References

External links
  Map of the parks of Nara Prefecture

Parks and gardens in Nara Prefecture
Protected areas established in 1967